PDE7B is a mammalian gene that encodes a 3'5'-cyclic nucleotide phosphodiesterase (PDE) that converts 3'5'-cyclic adenosine monophosphate (cAMP) to 5'AMP as part of cyclic nucleotide signaling pathways. There are 21 PDE genes in mammals that are pharmacologically-grouped into 11 families based on their biochemical characteristics and sequence conservation. The PDE7 family is composed of PDEs encoded by two genes, PDE7A and PDE7B. These PDEs are highly specific for cAMP relative to cGMP.

References

Enzymes
Molecular biology